Carlos Tomás Wilson (1889–1952) was an Argentine footballer who played as goalkeeper for the Club Atlético San Isidro, having also been called up for the Argentina national team.

Career 
Wilson was born in Rosario, Argentina. A son of a British-origin family, he began his career in San Isidro. In 1916 he was part of the team that played the championship final against Racing Club, which San Isidro lost by 1–0.

In the national team, Carlos Wilson was the successor of José Buruca Laforia as goalkeeper. He played for Argentina between 1907 and 1916, being part of the team that attended the Copa Centenario Revolución de Mayo, considered predecessor of current Copa América.

Wilson played a total of 28 international matches for Argentina.

References 

Argentine footballers
Footballers from Buenos Aires
Argentine people of English descent
1889 births
1952 deaths
Association football goalkeepers
Río de la Plata